Shaq Fu: A Legend Reborn is a 2018 beat'em up video game developed by Big Deez Productions and published by Mad Dog Games. It is a sequel to Shaq Fu (1994) and it was released for Microsoft Windows, Nintendo Switch, PlayStation 4 and Xbox One in June 2018. The game received generally negative reviews upon release.

Gameplay
A Legend Reborn features gameplay that heavily differs from its predecessor, more akin to a beat 'em up. The player character has a variety of moves, such as rolling and dashing, which stuns enemies. Players can also chain attacks together and use a special attack.

Development
In March 2014, an Indiegogo crowdfunding campaign was started for a sequel titled Shaq Fu: A Legend Reborn. The funding goal was US$450,000. If achieved, the game creators at Big Deez Productions promised that the game would be released for consoles (PC, PlayStation 4, Xbox One, Wii U, PlayStation 3, and Xbox 360). The campaign ended on May 5, 2014, with the funding goal exceeded at $473,884. The PlayStation 3, Wii U and Xbox 360 versions were later cancelled.

After A Legend Reborn was successfully funded, there was little significant word on its developmental status and release timetable over the next few years. In late 2016, the sequel's developers reported on Indiegogo that its development was nearly finished, but declined to provide a concrete release date.  Over a month after Nintendo launched the Nintendo Switch, a special trailer confirmed that A Legend Reborn will be available on that system.  Saber Interactive also announced that it would offer free copies of the game to early adopters of NBA Playgrounds on the console as compensation for the initial lack of online features.  In early 2018, it also confirmed that the game was delayed due to unexpected licensing issues that required some significant rework. The game was expected to come out in the second quarter of 2018, and the Wii U, PlayStation 3 and Xbox 360 versions were cancelled. The sequel was released on June 5, 2018.

On June 29, 2018, a DLC add-on titled Barack Fu: The Adventures of Dirty Barry was revealed in two launch trailers that were shared by multiple gaming groups and news sites alike; it was also made available for free to those who had purchased a physical copy of A Legend Reborn. Barack Fu continues the story of A Legend Reborn, following the ending of Shaq's campaign, with the player now taking control of a fictionalized version of former United States President Barack Obama through two new stages (increasing the full level count of the game from six to eight) as he goes through France and Outer Space to defeat a fictional take on rapper/singer/songwriter Kanye West.

Reception
With the exception of the Xbox One version of the game, Shaq Fu: A Legend Reborn received "generally unfavorable" reviews according to review aggregator Metacritic. Kellen Beck from Mashable criticized the game's humor for being offensive, repetitive and reliant on stereotypes.  GameRankings gave the PlayStation 4 version an aggregated score of 35/100.

References

2018 video games
Android (operating system) games
Cancelled PlayStation 3 games
Cancelled Xbox 360 games
Cancelled Wii U games
Cultural depictions of basketball players
iOS games
Nintendo Switch games
PlayStation 4 games
Shaquille O'Neal
Sports fiction
Vaporware video games
Fighting games
Video game sequels
Video games developed in the United States
Video games featuring black protagonists
Video games set in China
Video games based on real people
Windows games
Xbox One games